Peter Erskine (born June 5, 1954) is an American jazz drummer who was a member of the jazz fusion groups Weather Report and Steps Ahead.

Early life and education 

Erskine was born in Somers Point, New Jersey, U.S. He began playing the drums at the age of four. He graduated from the Interlochen Arts Academy in Michigan, then studied percussion at Indiana University.

Career
His professional music career started in 1972 when he joined the Stan Kenton Orchestra. After three years with Kenton, he joined Maynard Ferguson for two years. In 1978, he joined Weather Report, joining Jaco Pastorius in the rhythm section. After four years and five albums with Weather Report and the Jaco Pastorius big band's Word of Mouth, he joined Steps Ahead.

In 1983, he performed on the Antilles Records release Swingrass '83. He toured the US in 1992 with Chick Corea.

Erskine splits his time as a musician and a professor at the Thornton School of Music at the University of Southern California.

He was featured on Kate Bush's 2005 album Aerial, where Erskine teamed with bass player Eberhard Weber. Diana Krall, Eliane Elias, Queen Latifah and Linda Ronstadt, as well as Scottish and Finnish classical orchestras, have had Erskine perform as a featured musician.

In 2011, he appeared on stage at the Royal Opera House, London in the new opera Anna Nicole.

Honors and awards
In 1992, he was awarded an Honorary Doctorate of Music from Berklee College of Music.

Personal life
Erskine is married to Mutsuko Erskine. The two have two children, actress and writer Maya Erskine, and film editor and producer Taichi Erskine.

Discography

As leader 

Source:

As co-leader 
 1985: Current Events with John Abercrombie, Marc Johnson (ECM, 1986)
 1988: John Abercrombie / Marc Johnson / Peter Erskine (ECM, 1989) – live
 1991: StAR with Jan Garbarek, Miroslav Vitous (ECM, 1991)

 1994: Traction Avant with Alessandro Galati, Palle Danielsson (Via Veneto, 1995)
 1995?: From Kenton to Now with Richard Torres (Fuzzy Music, 1995)
 1996: Jason Salad! with Alessandro Galati, John Patitucci, Bob Sheppard (Via Veneto, 1997)
 1996: Turnage: Blood on the Floor with John Scofield, Martin Robertson, Peter Rundel (Decca, 1997)
 1998: Live at the Baked Potato with Dirk K., Jörg Kleutgens (Kalle Fornia, 1998) – live
 1998: The Hudson Project with John Abercrombie, Bob Mintzer, John Patitucci (Stretch, 2000) – live
 2000: ELB with Nguyên Lê, Michel Benita (ACT, 2001)
 2001: Badlands with Alan Pasqua, Dave Carpenter (Fuzzy Music, 2002)
 2002?: Turnage: Fractured Lines with Evelyn Glennie, Christian Lindberg, Leonard Slatkin (Chandos, 2002)
 2006: Worth the Wait with Tim Hagans (Fuzzy Music, 2008) – live
 2008?: Dream Flight with ELB (ACT, 2008)
 2009?: The Trio Live @ Charlie O's (Fuzzy Music, 2009) – live
 2009: Scenes from a Dream with Chris Minh Doky, Larry Goldings (Red Dot Music, 2010)
 2010?: The Interlochen Concert with Alan Pasqua, Darek Oles (Fuzzy Music, 2010) – live
 2010?: Standards 2: Movie Music with Bob Mintzer, Darek Oleszkiewicz, Alan Pasqua (Fuzzy Music, 2011) – soundtrack
 2014: Trio M/E/D with Palle Danielsson, Rita Marcotulli (Abeat, 2015) – live
 2015: How Long Is Now? with Lars Danielsson, Iiro Rantala (ACT, 2016)
 2019: 3 Nights in L.A. with George Garzone, Alan Pasqua and Darek Oles (Fuzzy Music, 2019)[3CD] – live
 2021: Live In Italy with Alan Pasqua, Darek Oles (Fuzzy Music, 2022) – live

Source:

As a member 
Steps Ahead
 Steps Ahead (Elektra/Musician, 1983)
 Modern Times (Elektra/Musician, 1984)
 Magnetic (Elektra, 1986)
 Holding Together (NYC, 2002)[2CD] – live rec. 1999

As sideman 

With Rez Abbasi
 Third Ear (Cathexis, 1995) – rec. 1991–92
 Modern Memory (Cathexis, 1998)

With John Abercrombie
 1987: Getting There (ECM, 1988)
 1992: November (ECM, 1993)

With David Benoit
 Waiting for Spring (GRP, 1989)
 Letter to Evan (GRP, 1992)
 The Benoit/Freeman Project 2 with Russ Freeman (Peak, 2004)

With Wayne Bergeron
 You Call This a Living? (Weg, 2002)
 Full Circle (Wayne Bergeron, 2016) – rec. 2012–15

With Warren Bernhardt
 Warren Bernhardt Trio '83 (DMP, 1983)
 Hands On (DMP, 1987)
 Heat of the Moment (DMP, 1989)
 Amelia's Song (DMP, 2003)
 So Real (DMP, 2003)

With Randy Bernsen
 Music for Planets People and Washing Machines (Amc, 1984)
 Mo' Wasabi (Zebra, 1986)

With Chris Botti
 Slowing Down the World (GRP, 1999)
 December (Columbia, 2002)

With Michael Bublé
 Crazy Love (Reprise, 2009)
 Christmas (Reprise, 2011)
 Love (Reprise, 2018)

With Gary Burton
 1988?: Times Like These (GRP, 1988)
 1989: Reunion (GRP, 1990)
 1991?: Cool Nights (GRP, 1991)
 1993: It's Another Day (GRP, 1994)
 1996: Departure (Concord Jazz, 1997)

With Joey Calderazzo
 In the Door (Blue Note, 1991)
 The Traveler (Blue Note, 1993)

With George Cables
 Cables' Vision (Contemporary, 1980)
 Whisper Not (Atlas, 1981)
 The Big Jazz Trio (Eastworld, 1984)
 Circle (Contemporary, 1985)
 Shared Secrets (MuseFX, 2002)

With Alex Cline
 Sparks Fly Upward (Cryptogramophone, 1999)
 The Constant Flame (Cryptogramophone, 2001)

With Pino Daniele
 Medina (RCA, 2001)
 Passi D'Autore (RCA, 2004)
 Il mio nome è Pino Daniele e vivo qui (RCA, 2007)

With Eddie Daniels
 Benny Rides Again with Gary Burton (GRP, 1992)
 Under the Influence (GRP, 1993)
 The Five Seasons (Shanachie, 1995)

With Yelena Eckemoff
 Cold Sun (L&H, 2010)
 Flying Steps (L&H, 2010)
 Glass Song (L&H, 2013)
 Desert (L&H, 2018)

With Eliane Elias
 Cross Currents (Denon, 1987)
 So Far So Close (Blue Note, 1989)
 A Long Story (Manhattan, 1991)
 Fantasia (Blue Note, 1992)
 Paulistana (Blue Note, 1993)

With Maynard Ferguson
 Conquistador (Columbia, 1977)
 New Vintage (Columbia, 1977)
 Carnival (Columbia, 1978)

With Don Grolnick
 Hearts and Numbers (Hip Pocket, 1985)
 Weaver of Dreams (Blue Note, 1990)

With Bob James
 Foxie (Tappan Zee, 1983)
 The Genie: Themes & Variations From The TV Series "Taxi" (Columbia, 1983)
 The Swan (CBS/Sony, 1984)

With Marc Johnson
 Bass Desires (ECM, 1985)
 Second Sight (ECM, 1987)

With Stan Kenton
 National Anthems of the World (Creative World, 1972)
 Birthday in Britain (Creative World, 1973)
 7.5 on the Richter Scale (Creative World, 1973)
 Live at the London Hilton 1973 Vol. 2 (Status, 1973) – live
 Fire, Fury, and Fun (Creative World, 1974)
 Stan Kenton plays Chicago (Creative World, 1974)
 Street of Dreams (Creative World, 1992) – rec. 1970–76
 Live at Carthage College Vol. 1 (Magic, 1994) – live
 Live at the London Hilton 1973 Vol. 1 (Status, 1994) – live rec. 1973
 At Pavilion Hemel Hempstead England 1973 (Status, 1996) – live rec. 1973
 Live at Newport Jazz Festival (Jazz Band, 1999) – live
 At the Arcadia Theatre 1974 (Magic, 2000) – live rec. 1974

With Diana Krall
 The Look of Love (Verve, 2001)
 The Girl in the Other Room (Verve, 2004)

With Chuck Loeb
 Simple Things (DMP, 1994)
 Silhouette (Shanachie, 2013)

With Mike Mainieri
 Wanderlust (Warner Bros., 1981)
 An American Diary (NYC, 1995)
 An American Diary: The Dreamings (NYC, 1997)

With Vince Mendoza
 Start Here (World Pacific, 1990)
 Jazzpaña (Atlantic, 1993)
 Sketches (ACT, 1994)
 WDR Big Band Köln, Caribbean Night (BHM Productions, 1997)

With Al Di Meola
 Orange and Blue (Tomato, 1994)
 The Infinite Desire (Telarc, 1998)
 Pursuit of Radical Rhapsody (Concord, 2011)

With Bob Mintzer
 Source (Agharta, 1982)
 Papa Lips (Eastworld , 1983)
 Incredible Journey (DMP, 1985)
 Camouflage (DMP, 1986)
 Spectrum (DMP, 1988)
 Urban Contours (DMP, 1989)
 Art of the Big Band (DMP, 1991)
 Departure (DMP, 1993)
 Hymn (Owl, 1991) – rec. 1990
 I Remember Jaco (Novus, 1992)
 The First Decade (DMP, 1995)
 Quality Time (TVT, 1998)
 Gently (DMP, 2002)
 For the Moment, (MCG Jazz, 2012)
 All L.A. Band (Fuzzy, 2016)

With Makoto Ozone
 Now You Know (Columbia, 1987)
 Walk Alone (JVC Victor, 1992)

With Alan Pasqua
 My New Old Friend (Cryptogramophone, 2005)
 Standards (Fuzzy Music, 2007)

With Jaco Pastorius
 Word of Mouth (Warner Bros., 1981) – rec. 1980–81
 Invitation (Warner Bros., 1983) – live rec. 1982
 The Birthday Concert (Warner Bros., 1995) – rec. 1981
 Twins Live in Japan 1982 (1999) – live rec. 1982
 Guitar & Bass (2004)
 Live in Japan (2005)
 Introducing: Jaco Pastorius (2006)
 The Word Is Out (2006)
 Live and Outrageous (2007)
 The Florida Concert (2008)
 Truth, Liberty & Soul (Resonance, 2017) – live rec. 1982

With John Patitucci
 John Patitucci (GRP, 1987)
 Sketchbook (GRP, 1990)
 Mistura Fina (GRP, 1995)

With Lee Ritenour
 Rit's House (GRP, 2002)
 Rhythm Sessions (Concord, 2012)

With John Scofield
 Summertime with Pat Metheny (Bugsy, 1994)[2CD]
 Shortcuts - Jazzpar Combo 1999 with Hans Ulrik (Stunt, 2000) – rec. 1999

With Mike Stern
 Time in Place (Atlantic, 1988)
 Jigsaw (Atlantic, 1989)

With Sadao Watanabe
 Sweet Deal (Elektra, 1991)
 A Night with Strings (Elektra, 1992)
 I'm with you (Victor, 2014)

With Weather Report
 Mr. Gone (Columbia, 1978)
 8:30 (Columbia, 1979)
 Night Passage (Columbia, 1980)
 Weather Report (Columbia, 1982)
 This is This! (Columbia, 1986)
 Live and Unreleased (Columbia, 2002)
 Forecast: Tomorrow (Columbia, 2006)

With Kenny Wheeler
 Music for Large & Small Ensembles (ECM, 1990)
 The Widow in the Window (ECM, 1990)
 Kayak (Ah Um, 1992)
Source:

With others
 Joni Mitchell, Mingus (Asylum, 1979)
 Bobby Hutcherson, Un Poco Loco (Columbia, 1979) – rec. 1979
 Kazumi Watanabe, To Chi Ka (Nippon Columbia, 1980)
 Joe Henderson, Relaxin' at Camarillo (Contemporary, 1981) – rec. 1979
 Various Artists, Swingrass '83 (Antilles, 1983)
 Ben Sidran, Bop City (Antilles, 1984)
 Andy LaVerne, Liquid Silver (DMP, 1984)
 Bill Reichenbach Jr., Bill Reichenbach Quartet (Silver Seven, 1984)
 Stanley Jordan, Magic Touch (Blue Note, 1985)
 Peter Sprague, Na Pali Coast (Concord Jazz, 1985)
 Mitchel Forman, Train of Thought (Magenta, 1985)
 Gary Peacock, Guamba (ECM, 1987)
 Bob Berg, Short Stories (Denon, 1987)
 Michael Brecker, Don't Try This at Home (Impulse!, 1988)
 Doc Severinsen, Facets (Amherst, 1988)
 Lyle Mays, Street Dreams (Geffen, 1988)
 Rickie Lee Jones, Flying Cowboys (Geffen, 1989)
 Joe Diorio, Minor Elegance (MGI, 1989)
 Michael Franks, Blue Pacific (Reprise, 1990)
 Wolfgang Muthspiel, The Promise (Amadeo, 1990)
 Rick Margitza, Hope (Blue Note, 1991)
 Bob Sheppard, Tell Tale Signs (Windham Hill Jazz, 1991)
 Ralph Towner, Open Letter (ECM, 1992)
 John Beasley, Cauldron (Windham Hill Jazz, 1992)
 Randy Crawford, Through the Eyes of Love (Warner Bros., 1992)
 Jimmy Haslip, Arc (GRP, 1993)
 Arturo Sandoval, Dream Come True (GRP, 1993)
 Tiger Okoshi, Echoes of a Note (JVC, 1993)
 Michel Legrand, Michel Plays Legrand (LaserLight, 1993)
 Jon Herington, The Complete Rhyming Dictionary (Glass House, 1993)
 Toots Thielemans, East Coast West Coast (Reprise, 1994)
 Hubert Laws, Storm Then the Calm (Jazz Heritage, 1994)
 Michael Franks, Abandoned Garden (Warner Bros., 1995)
 Steely Dan, Alive in America (Giant, 1995) – live rec. 1993–94
 Didier Lockwood, New York Rendez-Vous (JMS., 1995)
 Martial Solal, Triangle (JMS., 1995)
 Kyle Eastwood, From There to Here (Columbia, 1998)
 Steve Tyrell, A New Standard	(Atlantic, 1999)
 Brandon Fields, Fields & Strings (Paras Recordings, 1999)
 Andy Summers, Green Chimneys (BMG, 1999)
 Rolf Kühn, Internal Eyes (Intuition, 1999)
 Rickie Lee Jones, It's Like This (Artemis, 2000)
 Don Grolnick, London Concert (Fuzzy Music, 2000) – live rec. 1995
 Joni Mitchell, Both Sides Now (Reprise, 2000) – rec. 1999
 Marc Antoine, Cruisin''' (GRP, 2001)
 Laurence Juber, Different Times (Solid Air, 2001)
 Kurt Elling, Flirting with Twilight (Blue Note, 2001)
 Barbra Streisand, Christmas Memories (Columbia, 2001)
 Diane Schuur, Midnight (Concord, 2003)
 Gordon Goodwin's Big Phat Band, XXL (Silverline, 2003)
 Al Jarreau, Accentuate the Positive (GRP, 2004)
 Linda Ronstadt, Hummin' to Myself (Verve, 2004)
 Kate Bush, Aerial (EMI, 2005)
 Eric Marienthal, Got You Covered (Peak, 2005)
 Chris Walden Big Band, Home of My Heart (Origin, 2005)
 Joe Zawinul, Weather Update (Geneon, 2005)[DVD-Video]
 Randy Brecker, Some Skunk Funk (Telarc, 2005) – rec. 2003
 Matt Dusk, Back in Town (Decca, 2006)
 Bob Florence, Eternal Licks and Grooves (Mama, 2007)
 Lynda Carter, At Last (Potomac Productions, 2009)
 Michael Bublé, Crazy Love (Reprise, 2009)
 Dado Moroni, Live in Beverly Hills (Resonance, 2010)[CD + DVD-Video]
 Barbra Streisand, What Matters Most (Columbia, 2011)
 Rod Stewart, Merry Christmas Baby (Verve, 2012)
 Melody Gardot, The Absence (Decca, 2012)
 Tierney Sutton, After Blue (BFM Jazz, 2013)
 Janis Siegel, Nightsongs (Palmetto, 2013)
 Andrea Bocelli, Passione (Verve, 2013)
 Barbra Streisand, Partners (Columbia, 2014)
 Sara Niemietz, Fountain & Vine (Levi Snuff Music, 2015)
 Laura Pausini, Laura Xmas (Warner Music Latina, 2016)
 Katharine McPhee, I Fall in Love Too Easily (BMG, 2017)
 Martina McBride, It's the Holiday Season (Broken Bow, 2018)
Source:

 Books 
 Time Awareness The Erskine Method for Drumset My Book The Drum Perspective Drum Concepts and Techniques No Beethoven: An Autobiography and Chronicle of Weather Report DVD The Erskine Method for Drumset'' (Alfred Publishing Company)

References

External links 

 
 Podcast featuring "Joy Luck" by Peter Erskine
Peter Erskine Interview NAMM Oral History Library (2011)

1954 births
Living people
Interlochen Center for the Arts alumni
Jacobs School of Music alumni
USC Thornton School of Music faculty
People from Somers Point, New Jersey
Musicians from New Jersey
American jazz drummers
American session musicians
Academics of the Royal Academy of Music
Grammy Award winners
ECM Records artists
Weather Report members
Contemporary Records artists
20th-century American drummers
American male drummers
American male jazz musicians
Steps Ahead members
Yellowjackets members
Free Flight (band) members
20th-century American male musicians